World Productions is a British television production company, founded on 20 March 1990 by acclaimed producer Tony Garnett, and owned by ITV plc following a takeover in 2017.

History
The company's first major series was the police drama Between the Lines (BBC1, 1992–94), and throughout the decade they went on to produce a succession of drama series. The most notable of these include This Life (BBC2, 1996–97), about a group of young law students in London; vampire-based thriller Ultraviolet (Channel 4, 1998); and a police series for the BBC, The Cops (BBC2, 1998–99), which was so controversial in its depiction of the police force that official police advice was withdrawn for the second series.

More recently, the company has made the series No Angels (2004–2006), a drama based around the lives of young nurses, and Goldplated for Channel 4. For Channel Five, it produced the Perfect Day trilogy and Tripping Over, a co-production with Network Ten in Australia. It also co-produced a one-off This Life + 10 reunion special with BBC Wales, transmitted in early 2007.

Marcus Evans takeover
It was announced in February 2012 that the company had been taken over by Marcus Evans Entertainment owned by billionaire businessman and owner of Ipswich Town F.C., Marcus Evans. Evans's company had been looking to get involved with television and film production for a number of years beforehand, and in 2010, set up its own production operation, Marcus Evans Entertainment.

Takeover by ITV plc 
ITV plc announced in May 2017 that they had taken over World Productions. As a result of the deal, World Productions became a unit of ITV Studios and ITV Studios Global Entertainment began distributing all future series internationally.

In 2018, the series Bodyguard which World Productions produced, become the most-watched TV show in the UK since 2008, achieving approximately 10.4 million viewers throughout the programme.

Filmography

Awards

2012

-Royal Television Society – Midlands (2012)
-Winner – Best Drama – Line of Duty
-Winner – Best Acting Performance (Male) – Lennie James
-Winner – Best Newcomer (Acting Performance) Gregory Piper

2011

-United
-Prix Europa Nomination Best Drama

2009

-Hancock and Joan
-BAFTA Nomination – Best Single Drama
-BAFTA Nomination – Best Actor – Ken Stott
-BAFTA Nomination – Best Actress – Maxine Peake
-Broadcast Awards Finalist – Best Single Drama

2008

-Party Animals
-Broadcast Press Guild Nomination – Best Drama Series

2007

-Perfect Day
-Rose D'Or Nomination – Best Comedy

2005

-Outlaws
-BAFTA Nomination – Best Drama Serial

-Ahead of the Class
-Broadcast Awards Nomination – Best Single Drama
-RTS Awards Nomination – Best Actress – Julia Walters
-RTS Awards Nomination – Best Single Drama

-No Angels
-Indie Awards Nomination – Best Drama Series

2004

-Murder Prevention
-RTS Craft and Design Award – Best Sound

-Love Again
-RTS Awards Nomination – Best Single Drama
-BANFF Awards Nomination – Best Single Drama

2003

-Buried
-BAFTA Award – Best Drama Series

2002

-Men Only
-BAFTA Nomination – Best New Writer

2001

-The Cops
-BAFTA Nomination – Best Drama Series

-World Productions
-won BAFTA Television Craft Award Special Achievement Award

2000

-The Cops
-BAFTA TV Award – Best Drama Series

1999

-The Cops
-BAFTA TV awards – Best Drama Series
-RTS Awards – Best Drama Series

1998

-Ballykissangel
-Broadcasting Press Guild – Best Actor – Tony Doyle

-This Life
-RTS Television Award – Best Drama Series
-BAFTA TV Award – Best Actress – Daniela Nardini

1997

-This Life
-The Writers' Guild of Great Britain – Best Original TV Drama Series
-South Bank Show Award for TV Drama

1996

-Ballykissangel
-Royal Television Society – Best Drama Series
-National TV Awards – Most Popular Actress – Dervla Kirwin

1994

-Cardiac Arrest
-BAFTA Nomination – Best Editing

-Between The Lines
-BAFTA Award – Best Drama

1993

-Between The Lines
-Writer's Guild of Great Britain Award – Best Drama Series

1992

-Between The Lines
-Broadcasting Press Guild – Best Drama Series

References

External links
Official company website

1990 establishments in England
British companies established in 1990
Mass media companies established in 1990
ITV (TV network)
Television production companies of the United Kingdom
2012 mergers and acquisitions
2017 mergers and acquisitions
Mass media companies based in London